Erwin Koeman (born 20 September 1961) is a former Dutch professional football player who currently serves as an assistant coach for the Netherlands national team.

Personal life
He is the son of Dutch international footballer Martin Koeman, and, alongside his younger brother Ronald, has also represented the Netherlands. All three Koemans played for Groningen at some time during their careers. Erwin Koeman's son, Len, is also a footballer and currently plays for the Helmond Sport youth team.

Ronald Koeman, his younger brother, is a manager who was most recently the coach of FC Barcelona.

Club career
Koeman played with Groningen, Mechelen, where he won the Belgian League in 1989 and 1988 Cup Winners' Cup during the team's heyday and PSV, where they became league champions in 1990–91 and 1991–92.

International career
 
Koeman was a midfielder for the Netherlands team that won the UEFA Euro 1988 competition, and also featured in the 1990 FIFA World Cup. In total, he was capped 31 times, scoring twice between 1983 and 1994.

Managerial career
Koeman finished his playing career with Groningen in 1998 and became youth coach at PSV. In October 2001, he was promoted to assistant manager under Eric Gerets, and for the 2004–05 season became manager in RKC Waalwijk. He managed RKC for one season before moving to Feyenoord. In March 2006, he extended his contract to the summer 2009. However, on 3 May 2007, Koeman announced his immediate resignation due to motivational problems, after a troublesome season, where Feyenoord eventually finished seventh.

Starting on 1 May 2008, Koeman became the coach of the Hungary national football team. He was removed from his post on 23 July 2010.

Before the 2011–12 season, he was appointed as the new manager of FC Utrecht. However, on 18 October 2011 he quit the job citing bad working conditions and frustration after several key players had been sold.

On 16 June 2014, he was appointed as the assistant head coach of Southampton, where he worked alongside his brother, Ronald, for the first time.

On 17 June 2016, Ronald Koeman, his brother, named him as his assistant manager at Everton.

On 3 August, Erwin Koeman became the assistant of Phillip Cocu at Fenerbahçe. After the sacking of Philip Cocu, Erwin Koeman became the head coach of Fenerbahçe.

In February 2019, he was appointed as the new head coach of Oman, succeeding fellow Dutch national Pim Verbeek. Under his tenure, the Omani team participated in the 2022 FIFA World Cup qualification – AFC Second Round where they managed an impressive performance with only one lone defeat to Qatar away by one goal margin, winning the other games. This impressive performance of Oman, however, was not followed in the 24th Arabian Gulf Cup, where Oman as champions, were eliminated from the group stage. He was subsequently fired as coach of Oman.

On 2 June 2021, Koeman was appointed as the head coach of Beitar Jerusalem. On 1 December 2021, Koeman announced his retirement from coaching.

In May 2022, Koeman was announced as an assistant coach to his brother Ronald at the Netherlands national team, and would commence in the role on 1 January 2023 after the 2022 FIFA World Cup in Qatar.

Managerial statistics

Honours
KV Mechelen

 Belgian First Division: 1988–89
 Belgian Cup: 1986–87 (winners), 1990–91 (runners-up), 1991–92 (runners-up)
 European Cup Winners Cup: 1987–88 (winners)
 European Super Cup: 1988
 Amsterdam Tournament: 1989
 Joan Gamper Trophy: 1989
 Jules Pappaert Cup: 1990

PSV
Eredivisie: 1990–91, 1991–92
Johan Cruyff Shield: 1992
Netherlands
UEFA European Championship: 1988 (winners)

References

External links

1961 births
Living people
Footballers from Zaanstad
Dutch footballers
Association football midfielders
FC Groningen players
PSV Eindhoven players
K.V. Mechelen players
Eredivisie players
Belgian Pro League players
Netherlands international footballers
UEFA Euro 1988 players
1990 FIFA World Cup players
UEFA European Championship-winning players
Dutch expatriate footballers
Dutch expatriate sportspeople in Belgium
Expatriate footballers in Belgium
Dutch football managers
RKC Waalwijk managers
Feyenoord managers
Hungary national football team managers
FC Utrecht managers
FC Eindhoven managers
Southampton F.C. non-playing staff
Everton F.C. non-playing staff
Fenerbahçe football managers
Oman national football team managers
Beitar Jerusalem F.C. managers
Eredivisie managers
Eerste Divisie managers
Süper Lig managers
Israeli Premier League managers
Dutch expatriate football managers
Dutch expatriate sportspeople in Hungary
Dutch expatriate sportspeople in Turkey
Dutch expatriate sportspeople in England
Dutch expatriate sportspeople in Oman
Dutch expatriate sportspeople in Israel
Expatriate football managers in Hungary
Expatriate football managers in Turkey
Expatriate football managers in Oman
Expatriate football managers in Israel
Koeman family